{{Infobox radio network
| name = NHK Radio 2
| image = 
| type = Broadcast radio network
| branding = 
| airdate = April 6, 1931
| country = Japan
| market_share = 
| broadcast_area = Japan
| language(s) = Japanese
| format = News, Talk, Drama, information, local programming|
| owner = NHK
| key_people = 
| former_names = 
| digital = 
| radio_stations = See list
 is a Japanese radio station operated by the public broadcaster, NHK. Its  output consists of education programming where NHK Radio 2 is regarded as the radio version of NHK Educational TV and is broadly similar to South Korea's EBS FM. NHK Radio 2 is available mainly on AM. NHK Radio 2 is abolished in 2025. It began broadcasting on April 6, 1931.

Frequencies
Tokyo: 693kHz (Power: 500kW)
Osaka: 828kHz (Power: 300kW; 2020: 500kW)
Fukuoka: 1017kHz (Power: 50kW; 2020: 500kW)
Nagoya: 909kHz (Power: 10kW)
Sapporo: 747kHz (Power: 500kW)
Akita: 774kHz (Power: 500kW)
Kumamoto: 873kHz (Power: 500kW)

See also
NHK Radio 1
NHK Educational TV
NHK FM Broadcast

References

NHK
Broadcasting in Japan
Publicly funded broadcasters
Radio stations established in 1931
1931 establishments in Japan
Japanese radio networks